Eupithecia rosmarinata is a moth in the family Geometridae. It is found in France and Spain.

The larvae feed on Rosmarinus and Thymus species.

Gallery

References

External links

Lepiforum.de

Moths described in 1865
rosmarinata
Moths of Europe